Marto Gracias (died 24 July 2016) was an Indian footballer who played club football for Salgaocar SC and Tata SC, as a representative for Goa and Maharashtra, and on the India national team. He scored a hat-trick for the national team in a 4–0 win against Hong Kong in the 1967 Merdeka Cup.

References

1930s births
2016 deaths
Indian footballers
India international footballers
Salgaocar FC players
Footballers from Goa
Association footballers not categorized by position